Varchentin is a village and a former municipality  in the Mecklenburgische Seenplatte district, in Mecklenburg-Vorpommern, Germany. Since May 2019, it is part of the municipality Groß Plasten.

References

Former municipalities in Mecklenburg-Western Pomerania